Ceroglossus is a genus of beetles in the family Carabidae, whose members are restricted to Chile and Argentina. The genus contains the following species:

 Ceroglossus buqueti Laporte, 1834
 Ceroglossus chilensis Eschscholtz, 1829
 Ceroglossus darwini Hope, 1837
 Ceroglossus magellanicus Gehin, 1885
 Ceroglossus olivaceus Kraatz-Koschlau, 1886
 Ceroglossus snizeki Jiroux, 2006
 Ceroglossus solieri Roeschke, 1900
 Ceroglossus speciosus Gerstaecker, 1858
 Ceroglossus suturalis Fabricius, 1775

References

Carabinae
Carabidae genera
Beetles described in 1848